Italy competed at the FIS Alpine World Ski Championships 2021 in Cortina d'Ampezzo, Italy, from 8 to 21 February 2021.

Medalists

Results

Men

Women

See also
 Italy at the FIS Alpine World Ski Championships
 Italy national alpine ski team

References

External links
 Italian Winter Sports Federation 
 Cortina 2021 official site 

Nations at the FIS Alpine World Ski Championships 2021
Alpine World Ski Championships
Italy at the FIS Alpine World Ski Championships